Richard Allen Wudel (born June 1, 1941) is an American former politician. He has served as a Republican member in the South Dakota House of Representatives from 1989 to 1990, and 1999 to 2000.

References

1941 births
Living people
People from Belle Fourche, South Dakota
Republican Party members of the South Dakota House of Representatives
People from Parkston, South Dakota